Salzer, otherwise Saltzer and Sälzer, is a German surname meaning "salter". Notable people with this surname include the following:

 Bernhard Sälzer (1940–1993), German MEP
 Bruno Sälzer (born 1957), German CEO of Escada, international luxury fashion group
 Else Rambausek-Salzer (1907–1994), Austrian actress and singer
 Felix Salzer (1904–1986), Austrian-American music theorist and musicologist
 František Salzer (1902–1974), Czech actor and director
 Friedrich Salzer (1827–1876), German landscape painter
 Jerry Saltzer (born 1939), American computer scientist
 Lisel Salzer (1906–2005), Austrian-born American painter
 Monika Salzer (born 1948) Austrian psychotherapist, Protestant theologian and pastor, columnist, and author
 Otto Salzer (1874–1944), German racing car driver
 Robert Samuel Salzer (1919–1988), Vice Admiral of the United States Navy

German-language surnames